Pablo Arias may refer to:

Pablo Arias Echeverría (born 1970), Spanish politician
Pepe Arias (José Pablo Arias Martínez; 1900–1967), Argentine actor
Pablo Milanés (Pablo Milanés Arias; born 1943), Cuban musician